The Arlington Historical Museum in Arlington, Virginia houses 350,000 artifacts on rotating display. Its exhibits interpret the history of the area from Captain John Smith's encounter with Algonquin Native Americans in 1608 to the near-present, including a letter exchange between local students and Ronald Reagan following the assassination attempt on Reagan.

Established in 1962, the Arlington Historical Museum is operated by the Arlington Historical Society. It is housed in the former Hume School.

The Society also operates the 18th-century Ball-Sellers House as a historic house museum.

References

External links
 Arlington Historical Society

Museums in Arlington County, Virginia
History museums in Virginia